William Maxwell Simmers (7 August 1904 in Glasgow – 14 November 1972 in Helensburgh) was a Scottish rugby union player. He was often referred to as "Max" and/or "Bill". He was the 70th President of the Scottish Rugby Union.

Rugby Union career

Amateur career

He played for Glasgow Academicals.

Provincial career

He was capped for Glasgow District.

International career

Administrative career

He became the 70th President of the Scottish Rugby Union. He served one year from 1956 to 1957.

Family

He was the father of Brian Simmers, who was also capped for Scotland.

He married the English tennis player Gwen Sterry on 9 July 1932 at St Mark's Church, Surbiton.

References

Sources

 Bath, Richard (ed.) The Scotland Rugby Miscellany (Vision Sports Publishing Ltd, 2007 )

1904 births
1972 deaths
Scottish rugby union players
Scotland international rugby union players
Glasgow Academicals rugby union players
Glasgow District (rugby union) players
Presidents of the Scottish Rugby Union
Rugby union players from Glasgow
Rugby union forwards